The lava shearwater (Puffinus olsoni), or Olson's shearwater, was a species of shearwater that bred on Lanzarote and Fuerteventura in the Canary Islands. It is known from fossil remains, and was only described  in 1990. It was intermediate in size between the Manx shearwater and the little shearwater. The remains of the species are particularly common in lava fields.

The species is thought to have survived the arrival of the first settlers in the Canary Islands, and become extinct after the arrival of European settlers in the 15th century. It is suspected that the species became extinct due to hunting pressures and possibly the arrival of introduced species such as rats.

References
J. C. Rando, J. A. Alcover (2008) "Evidence for a second western Palaearctic seabird extinction during the last Millennium: the Lava Shearwater Puffinus olsoni" Ibis 150 (1), 188–192 

Puffinus
Late Quaternary prehistoric birds
Holocene extinctions
Birds of the Canary Islands
Birds described in 1990
Bird extinctions since 1500
Extinct birds of Atlantic islands